Vincent Millot was the defending champion, but lost in the second round to James McGee.

Frances Tiafoe won the title, defeating Marcelo Arévalo 6–1, 6–1 in the final.

Seeds

Draw

Finals

Top half

Bottom half

References
Main Draw
Qualifying Draw

Challenger Banque Nationale de Granby
Challenger de Granby